The 1931 Boston College Eagles football team represented Boston College as an independent during the 1931 college football season. The Eagles were led by fourth-year head coach Joe McKenney and played their home games at Fenway Park in Boston. The team finished with a record of 6–4.

Schedule

References

Boston College
Boston College Eagles football seasons
Boston College Eagles football
1930s in Boston